Calosoma glabratum is a species of ground beetle in the subfamily of Carabinae. It was described by Pierre François Marie Auguste Dejean in 1831.

References

glabratum
Beetles described in 1831